Atomic Rooster is a British rock band.

Atomic Rooster may also refer to:
 Atomic Roooster, their 1970 album
 Atomic Rooster (1980 album), their 1980 album